The Niementowski quinoline synthesis is the chemical reaction of anthranilic acids and ketones (or aldehydes) to form γ-hydroxyquinoline derivatives.

Overview
In 1894, Niementowski reported that 2-phenyl-4-hydroxyquinoline was formed when anthranilic acid and acetophenone were heated to 120–130 °C. He later found that at higher heat, 200 °C, anthranilic acid and heptaldehyde formed minimal yields of 4-hydroxy-3-pentaquinoline.  
Several reviews have been published.

Variations
The temperatures required for this reaction make it less popular than other quinoline synthetic procedures. However, variations have been proposed to make this a more pragmatic and useful reaction. Adding phosphorus oxychloride to the reaction mixture mediates a condensation to make both isomers of an important precursor to an important α1-adrenoreceptor antagonist. When the 3 position of an arylketone is substituted, it has been shown that a Niementowski-type reaction with propionic acid can produce a 4-hydroxyquinoline with 2-thiomethyl substitute. The method has also been altered to occur with a catalytic amount of base, or in the presence of polyphosphoric acid.

Mechanism
Because of the similarity of these to the reagents in the Friedlander quinolone synthesis, a benzaldehyde with an aldehyde or ketone, the Niementowski quinoline synthesis mechanism is minimally different from that of the Friedländer synthesis. While studied in depth, two reaction pathways are possible and both have significant support. The reaction is thought to begin with the formation of a Schiff base, and then proceed via an intra-molecular condensation to make an imine intermediate (see below). There is then a loss of water that leads to a ring closing and formation of the quinoline derivative. Most evidence supports this as the  mechanism in normal conditions of 120–130 °C. Alternatively, the reaction begins with an intermolecular condensation and subsequent formation of the imine intermediate. The latter has been shown to be more common under acidic or basic conditions. A similar pathway has been proposed for the Niementowski quinazoline synthesis.

References

Bibliography
Hartz, R. (2011) in Name Reactions in Heterocyclic Chemistry II, Jie Jack Li, E. J. Corey (eds.), Wiley, .

See also
 Camps quinoline synthesis
 Friedländer synthesis
 Pfitzinger reaction

Condensation reactions
Quinoline forming reactions
Name reactions